Oskol may refer to:

Oskol (river), river in Russia and Ukraine
Oskol Reservoir, artificial lake on Oskol River in Kharkiv Oblast, Ukraine
Novy Oskol, town in Belgorod Oblast, Russia
Stary Oskol, city in Belgorod Oblast, Russia
Oskol-e Sofla, village in Kurdistan Province, Iran